Bedriñana (variant: San Andrés de Bedriñana) is one of 41 parishes (administrative divisions) in Villaviciosa, a municipality within the province and autonomous community of Asturias, in northern Spain.

Villages and hamlets
 Las Cabañas
 La Campa
 La Ermita
 Maseras
 Pentanes
 La Peruyera
 La Pola
 El Porreo
 El Retiro
 La Riega
 Los Torales

References
Asturian Society of Economic and Industrial Studies. "List of entities population of Asturias 2008» . Retrieved October 22, 2009.

Parishes in Villaviciosa